Zarifa is a given name and surname. Notable people with the name include:

David Zarifa, Canadian academic
Zarifa Aliyeva, Azerbaijani ophthalmologist
Zarifa Pashaevna Mgoyan, the birth name of Russian pop singer Zara
Zarifa Sautieva, Russian museum director and political activist
Zarifa Ghafari, Afghan activist

See also
Zarif (given name), masculine form of the name Zarifa